Jeana delicatula is a moth of the family Hepialidae. It is endemic to Tasmania and Victoria.

The larvae are subterranean and probably feed on the roots and bases of grasses.

References

Moths described in 1935
Hepialidae